Rudiyana (born 4 May 1992) is an Indonesian professional footballer who plays as a forward for Liga 2 club Persikab Bandung.

Club career
He was promoted from Persib Bandung U-21 to Persib Bandung on 14 February 2014.

Honours

Club
Persib Bandung
 Indonesia Super League: 2014
 Indonesia President's Cup: 2015

References

External links
 
 Rudiyana at Liga Indonesia

1992 births
Association football forwards
Living people
Sportspeople from Bandung
Indonesian footballers
Liga 1 (Indonesia) players
Persib Bandung players
Indonesian Super League-winning players